Raby is a hamlet on the Wirral Peninsula, Merseyside, England. Administratively it is located within the Metropolitan Borough of Wirral as part of Clatterbridge Ward. The settlement is within the parliamentary constituency of Wirral South.

At the time of the United Kingdom Census 2001, Raby had a total population of 100.

History
The name is of Viking origin, deriving from the Old Norse Ra-byr, meaning 'boundary settlement'. It is believed to be so named because it lay close to the boundary which existed in the 10th and 11th centuries between the Norse colony in Wirral to the north, centred on Thingwall, and Anglo-Saxon Mercia to the south.

Raby was a township in Neston Parish of the Wirral Hundred with a population of 131 in 1801, 195 in 1851, 350 in 1901 and 308 in 1951.

Geography

Community
Raby is a rural community, comprising a few houses, two farms and an old, thatched public house, the 'Wheatsheaf', which is well known in the locality.  The pub is owned by the Leverhulme Estate, which owns much land locally.

Raby, along with the neighbouring villages of Brimstage and Thornton Hough, are within an Area of Special Landscape Value, a protective designation to preserve the character and appearance of the area. This is part of the Wirral Unitary Development Plan of the Metropolitan Borough of Wirral.

The parish church is All Saints Church, Thornton Hough.  The local primary school is Thornton Hough Primary.

Transport

Road
Raby is accessible from the A540 to the south-west, the B5151 to the east and the B5136 to the north.

Bus
Services operating in the Raby Area as of 2015:

Rail
This station is on the Wirral Line of the Merseyrail network, with frequent services to Liverpool, Chester and Ellesmere Port.

See also
Listed buildings in Raby, Merseyside

References

Bibliography

External links

Towns and villages in the Metropolitan Borough of Wirral